The American Business Council Nigeria (ABCN) is a non-profit, non-partisan, issues-oriented business organization that provides the private sector's perspective in the Nigeria-U.S. relationship and an affiliate of the U.S Chamber of Commerce in Nigeria incorporated in February 2007. The Council currently consists of 65 members with Dipo Faulkner as the President and Margaret Olele as the Chief Executive Officer.

Board of directors 
The following companies are represented on the ABCN Board of Directors.

 VerrakiATC Nigeria 
 Capital Alliance Nigeria 
 Cisco Systems (Nigeria) Ltd. 
 Citibank 
 Coca Cola Nigeria Limited 
 Cummins West Africa Ltd 
 Deloitte 
 Dubri Oil Company Ltd 
 Exxon Mobil 
 Kimberly Clark 
 KPMG Professional Services 
 Mastercard 
 HP 
 Pfizer

References

Non-profit organizations based in Washington, D.C.